Farid Szajnurov is a former international speedway rider from the Soviet Union.

Speedway career 
Szajnurov won a silver medal at the Speedway World Team Cup in the 1966 Speedway World Team Cup. The following year he was part of the Soviet team that won the bronze medal at the 1966 Speedway World Team Cup. He was the Champion of the Soviet Union in 1966.

World final appearances

World Team Cup
 1966 -  Wrocław, Olympic Stadium (with Boris Samorodov / Igor Plekhanov / Viktor Trofimov) - 2nd - 25pts (4)
 1967 -  Malmö, Malmö Stadion (with Boris Samorodov / Gabdrakhman Kadyrov / Viktor Trofimov / Igor Plekhanov) - 3rd= - 19pts (1)

References 

Russian speedway riders
Living people
Year of birth missing (living people)